The 2022 Stonehill Skyhawks football team represented Stonehill College as a first-year member of the Northeast Conference (NEC) during the 2022 NCAA Division I FCS football season. The Skyhawks, led by six-year head coach Eli Gardner, played their home games at W.B. Mason Stadium. Stonehill was ineligible for NEC title and FCS postseason play due to transition from NCAA Division II.

Previous season
The Skyhawks finished the 2021 season with a record of 8–2, 6–2 NE-10 play to finish in third place.

Schedule

Game summaries

at Bloomsburg

Post

Duquesne

at Sacred Heart

at Saint Francis (PA)

Merrimack

Wagner

at LIU

Central Connecticut

References

Stonehill
Stonehill Skyhawks football seasons
Stonehill Skyhawks football